Camel Bobsled Race, also known as Q-Bert Mix, is a megamix of DJ Shadow's music, mixed by DJ Q-Bert. It was released on Mo' Wax in 1997. It peaked at number 62 on the UK Singles Chart.

Track listing

Personnel
Credits adapted from liner notes.

 DJ Shadow – production
 DJ Q-Bert – additional production, turntables, mixing
 Cut Chemist – "The Number Song (Cut Chemist Party Mix)" beats
 Gift of Gab – vocals
 James Lavelle – recording, liner notes
 Ben Drury – art direction
 E.J. Dobson – art direction
 Kai Clements – sleeve re-creation

Charts

References

External links
 

1997 live albums
DJ mix albums
DJ Shadow albums
Mo' Wax albums